The Brighton Speed Trials, in full The Brighton National Speed Trials, is commonly held to be the oldest running motor race. The first race was held 19–22 July 1905 after Sir Harry Preston persuaded Brighton town council to tarmac the surface of the road adjacent to the beach between the Palace Pier and Black Rock to hold motor racing events. This stretch was renamed Madeira Drive in 1909 and the event is still held there, normally on the second Saturday of September each year. In 1936 Motor Sport described the event as: "undoubtedly the most important speed-trials on the British Calendar."

The event is currently run as a quarter mile sprint for both cars and motorcycles, held under the auspices of the Motor Sports Association. The event is organised by the Brighton and Hove Motor Club, with the Sprint Section of the Vintage Motorcycle Club in charge of the Motorcycles.

Following a fatal motorcycle combination crash in 2012 Brighton & Hove City Council considered banning the event. However, on 23 January 2014 the Economic Development and Culture Committee voted in favour of the event continuing.

History

The Brighton National Speed Trials is commonly held to be the oldest running motor race. The first race was held 19–22 July 1905 after Sir Harry Preston persuaded Brighton town council to tarmac the surface of the road adjacent to the beach between the Palace Pier and Black Rock to hold motor racing events. This stretch was renamed Madeira Drive in 1909 and the event is still held there, normally on the second Saturday of September each year. In 1936 Motor Sport described the event as: "undoubtedly the most important speed-trials on the British Calendar."

Interruptions

The first speed trial, called the "Brighton Motor Trials", was held in July 1905, but because of the cost and opposition from ratepayers, it was not held again until 1923.

A police ban of racing on public roads interrupted activity from 1925–1931, but because Madeira Drive was a private road owned by the council it was eventually exempt from the ban.

The Speed Trials were not run between 1939–1945 due to World War II. The 1939 event had been scheduled for 23 September.

In 1969 the fuel crisis led to the cancellation of this year's event. Autocar reported in 1970: "Last year this traditional event did not take place because the condition of the road surface was thought unsuitable for the more powerful sprint cars."

In 2013 the council declined the club's application to run the event following a fatal accident in 2012.  Following a Save Brighton Speed Trails campaign the event was reinstated in 2014.

Notable people

George Abecassis
Sydney Allard
Prince Bira
Bill Boddy
John Cobb
Peter Collins
John Cooper
S. F. Edge
Archie Frazer Nash
Jack Fairman
Joe Fry
Bob Gerard
Mike Hawthorn
Earl Howe
Alec Issigonis
Denis Jenkinson
Roy Lane
Dorothy Levitt
Tony Marsh
Dean Moon
Stirling Moss
Reg Parnell
Kay Petre
Mike Pilbeam
David Piper
Dennis Poore
Ian Raby
Jack Sears
Geoffrey Taylor
Mickey Thompson
Ken Tyrrell
Peter Walker
Rob Walker
Peter Westbury
Ken Wharton

The Dragster Era
The first announcement that a dragster would race in Brighton came from Wally Parks, in an editorial in Hot Rod Magazine in August 1958. Parks had nominated Calvin Rice to travel from the USA to England with the Hot Rod Magazine Special for the speed trials. In the event the trip was aborted.

In 1961 Sydney Allard built the Allard dragster in the UK and its first competitive appearance was at the Brighton Speed Trials on 2 September 1961. A new track record over the kilometre was anticipated but a fuel line ruptured caused a misfire and a time of 37.91 secs. Hot Rod Magazine reported: "During warmup it backfired and blew off one set of blower pipes and never got going." The reputation of the car never fully recovered, and Bill Boddy, editor of Motor Sport, called it a fiasco, saying the mechanical problems had also occurred in testing at Boreham. The Autocar described the Allard dragster as a "gallant failure."

At Brighton on 15 September 1962 the Allard dragster clocked two runs at 22.30 and 22.04 seconds. A respectable performance but no outright win or record. Motor Sport reported: "It appears that before the end of the Brighton kilometre the Allard dragster had burst the pipe between supercharger and engine, a common problem with such an installation and the reason why the Americans bolt their blowers on the engine, eliminating a long induction pipe."

Sydney Allard was joined on 14 September 1963, by Dante Duce in Dean Moon's Mooneyes gas dragster and Mickey Thompson with his Ford-powered Harvey Aluminum Special for some match-race style action. It was not to be. The American cars were not really suited to the kilometre, and there were no clocks for a quarter-mile distance. They had no brakes at the front and parachute brakes at the rear, no rear suspension, and advertising on the bodywork. All of this was enough to give the scrutineers (technical inspectors) fits. The cars did demonstrations only, reduced to burnouts and wheelstands, but left a lasting impression on the crowd. The Allard dragster put two rods through the block on Madeira Drive that day. The Worden dragster of Tony Densham and Harry Worrall, a budget effort powered by a Shorrock-supercharged 1,500 c.c. Ford engine, was entered in the 1,101 to 1,500 c.c. racing car class, and, although not geared for the kilometre, finished second to Patsy Burt, in a time of 27.86 sec. Densham would later set the British land speed record at Elvington in the Ford-powered Commuter dragster.

The canny Duce returned in 1964 with the Moonbeam modified sports car, which at least looked like a traditional European sporty car, but with a drag race and Bonneville heritage. The car as raced in Brighton was fitted with a 375-cubic inch supercharged Chevrolet V8 engine and a Devin bodyshell, and was originally built in 1959. Dante Duce also borrowed an A.C. Shelby Cobra, chassis number CSX2345, from John Wyer, and entered it in the GT class, car number 110 at Brighton.
Duce cleaned up that day winning overall in the Moonbeam in a time of 21.95 sec, and first in Sports and GT cars over 2,500 c.c., in the Cobra roadster in 24.35 sec.

Soon Brighton started holding dragster demonstrations over the quarter mile. In 1972 Clive Skilton produced an 8.18 sec run in his rear-engined Chrysler dragster. In 1973 Dennis Priddle ran a smoky 7.69 sec quarter mile in his front-motored Chrysler dragster, which remains the quickest quarter yet seen on Brighton seafront. Motor Sport reported: "The sheer bravery and courage of the West Country lad as the Dragster accelerated along the bumpy, cambered road, brought forth the most incredible spontaneous round of applause heard at a motoring event for many years." It is said that the local police chief came to Priddle after the run and said "That was that most amazing thing I have ever seen and there's no way I am going to let you do it again!" 

The dragsters were getting too quick for Brighton and there were concerns about how to deal with fires involving exotic fuels. They faded from the scene with only occasional wins by drag-race type vehicles, such as Shaun Saunders (2000) and Paul Marston (2001, 2002).

Current events
The event is currently run as a quarter mile sprint for both cars and motorcycles, held under the auspices of the Motor Sports Association. The event is organised by the Brighton and Hove Motor Club, with the Sprint Section of the Vintage Motorcycle Club in charge of the Motorcycles. Entrants run individually, although in earlier days vehicles would race side by side. This practice was stopped following a number of accidents. The course length has varied over the years, generally becoming shorter to keep terminal speeds manageable as cars have got faster. The speed trials form a unique event, where vintage and exotic classics meet the latest in street and racing cars. Public access is allowed to the paddock and startline 'funnel' allowing visitors to get much closer to the action than at most events.

Following a fatal motorcycle combination crash in 2012 Brighton & Hove City Council considered banning the event. However, on 23 January 2014 the Economic Development and Culture Committee voted in favour of the event continuing, after a petition of more than 12,000 signatures was presented.

Timetable of events 
Times are approximate.

Classes of cars 
Handicap – Roadgoing cars of any type
Class 1 – Roadgoing and modified production cars up to 1400cc
Class 2 – Roadgoing and modified production cars over 1400cc and up to 2000cc
Class 3 – Roadgoing and modified production cars over 2000cc and up to 3500cc
Class 4 – Roadgoing and modified production cars over 3500cc
Class 5 – Clubmans
Class 6 – Sports Libre cars up to 1300cc
Class 7 – Sports Libre cars over 1300cc and up to 1600cc
Class 8 – Sports Libre cars over 1600cc 
Class 9 – Racing cars up to 500cc
Class 10 – Racing cars over 500cc and up to 1100cc
Class 11 – Racing cars over 1100cc and up to 1600cc
Class 12 – Racing cars over 1600cc and up to 2000cc
Class 13 – Racing and Sports cars constructed on or before 31 December 1959

Results

Track record
Car
1993, John Gray, SPA Judd V10, standing start 1/4-mile 8.90s

Bike
2009, Roger Simmons, Suzuki Hayabusa Turbo, standing start 1/4-mile 8.73s

Fastest time of the day
These are the fastest car times recorded on the day for each year.

Key: R = Course Record; S/C = Supercharged; T/C = Turbocharged.

Motorbikes fastest time of the day

Key: R = Course Record; S/C = Supercharged.

See also
 Firle Hill Climb
 Lewes Speed Trials
 Southport Speed Trials
 London to Brighton Veteran Car Run

References

 For a photograph of Noel Pope on his blown Brough see: Motor Sport, November 1946, Page 248. For a technical description of Pope's Brough see: Motor Sport, February 1948, Page 51.

Bibliography

 Split Seconds – My Racing Years, Raymond Mays "ghosted" by Dennis May, G.T. Foulis & Co. Ltd. 1952. 306 pages.
 Sprint: Speed Hillclimbs and Speed Trials in Britain: 1899–1925, T.R. Nicholson, (Timothy Robin), 1930–, Newton Abbot, David & Charles, 1969.
 Richard Shuttleworth: An Illustrated Biography, Kevin Desmond, Jane’s Publishing Co Ltd., 1982.
 The Brighton National Speed Trials in the 1960s, 1970s & 1980s (2004) Tony Gardiner, Veloce Publishing .

External links
 Brighton and Hove Motor Club Website. "Home Page", www.brightonandhovemotorclub.co.uk 
 Vintage Motorcycle Club Sprint Section Website – Many Images of Motorcycles at Brighton throughout the years. "Home Page", www.vmccsprint.co.uk 
 Pistonheads Article on the Speed Trials. "Brighton Speed Trials", Pistonheads.com
 Gumpert Apollo at the Speed Trials. "Brighton Speed Trials", Evo Magazine Website
 Pathe News clip from 1932. "Brooklands by the Sea", British Pathe Website''

Brighton
Drag racing venues in Europe
Motorsport venues in England
Sport in Brighton and Hove
Sussex